The Roman Catholic Diocese of Valle de Chalco (erected 8 July 2003) is a suffragan diocese of the Archdiocese of Tlalnepantla.

Ordinaries
Luis Artemio Flores Calzada (2003–2012), appointed Bishop of Tepic, Nayarit
Víctor René Rodríguez Gómez (2012 – Present)

External links and references

References 

Valle de Chalco
Valle de Chalco, Roman Catholic Diocese of
Valle de Chalco
Valle de Chalco
2003 establishments in Mexico